Thimbirigasyaya Divisional Secretariat is a  Divisional Secretariat  of Colombo District, of Western Province, Sri Lanka.

References
 Thimbirigasyaya Divisional Secretariat

Divisional Secretariats of Colombo District